The fourth and final season of Crazy Ex-Girlfriend premiered on The CW on October 12, 2018 and ran for 18 episodes until April 5, 2019. The season stars Rachel Bloom as Rebecca Bunch, a distraught young woman, dealing with the consequences of pleading guilty to attempted murder at the end of the previous season. Co-stars include Vincent Rodriguez III, Donna Lynne Champlin, Pete Gardner, Vella Lovell, Gabrielle Ruiz, Scott Michael Foster, and Skylar Astin.

Cast

Main
 Rachel Bloom as Rebecca Bunch
 Vincent Rodriguez III as Josh Chan
 Donna Lynne Champlin as Paula Proctor
 Pete Gardner as Darryl Whitefeather
 Vella Lovell as Heather Davis
 Gabrielle Ruiz as Valencia Perez
 Scott Michael Foster as Nathaniel Plimpton III
 Skylar Astin as Greg Serrano

Recurring
 Erick Lopez as Hector 
 Danny Jolles as George 
 Britney Young as Samantha "Nicky" Warner 
 Pam Murphy as Cybil 
 David Hull as Josh "White Josh" Wilson 
 Michael Hitchcock as Bert Buttenweiser 
 Michael Hyatt as Dr. Noelle Akopian 
 Esther Povitsky as Maya 
 Michael McMillian as Tim 
 Olivia Edward as Madison Whitefeather 
 David Grant Wright as Nathaniel Plimpton II 
 Parvesh Cheena as Sunil Odhav 
 Rene Gube as Father Joseph Brah 
 Burl Moseley as Jim 
 Clark Moore as AJ 
 Emma Willmann as Beth 
 Zayne Emory as Brendan Proctor 
 Gina Gallego as Mrs. Hernandez 
 Steele Stebbins as Tommy Proctor 
 Steve Monroe as Scott Proctor 
 Fernando Rivera as Vic 
 Rachel Grate as Audra Levine 
 Dan Gregor as Dr. Roth 
 Maribeth Monroe as April

Guest
 Paul Welsh as Trent Maddock 
 Piter Marek as Dr. Davit Akopian 
 Benjamin Siemon as Brody 
 Aline Brosh McKenna as Prosecutor (uncredited) 
 Kathy Najimy as herself 
 Patton Oswalt as Castleman 
 Allison Dunbar as Stacy Whitefeather 
 Nia Vardalos as Wendy Legrand 
 Natasha Behnam as Courtney Amjadi 
 P.L. Brown as Mr. Davis 
 Christine Estabrook as Patricia Davis 
 Joanna Sotomura as Zoe 
 Anjali Bhimani as Director 
 Luca Padovan as Tucker Bunch 
 Tan France as Fett Ragoso 
 Carlease Burke as Mrs. Beattie 
 Sharon Sachs as Evelyn 
 Elayne Boosler as herself 
 Judy Kain as Marilyn Levine 
 Damian Gomez as Emilio 
 Tovah Feldshuh as Naomi Bunch 
 Megan Amram as Nostalgia Cat 
 Fred Armisen as Itchy Cat 
 Todrick Hall as Funky Cat 
 Riki Lindhome as Hungry Cat 
 Rebekka Johnson as Elated Cat 
 Grant Rosenmeyer as Jason 
 Robin Thomas as Marco Serrano 
 Alberto Isaac as Joseph Chan 
 Jayden Lund as Guardrail 
 Phoebe Neidhardt as Joanne Perkins 
 Jay Hayden as Dr. Daniel Shin 
 Kunal Dudheker as Gynecologist 
 Cheri Oteri as Connie 
 Jacob Guenther as Chris 
 Toks Olagundoye as Julia 
 Juan Alfonso as Rusty 
 Carmela Zumbado as Denise Martinez 
 Alfred Yankovic as Bernie
 Michael McDonald as Open mic emcee

Episodes

Every song listed is performed by Rebecca, except where indicated. This season, at the end of the theme song, the woman who is "mistaken" for Rebecca (portrayed by Siri Miller) has a different line.

Special
A 42-minute documentary about the making of the series finale, entitled Crazy Ex-Girlfriend: Oh My God I Think It's Over, was released on the CW Seed app on March 30, 2019.

Production
The series was renewed for a fourth season on April 2, 2018. Along with the renewal announcement, creator and star Rachel Bloom stated that the fourth season would be the series' last. On July 13, it was announced that The CW had ordered 18 episodes for the final season, up from the past two seasons, which both contained 13 episodes. On August 6, it was reported that the role of Greg, played by Santino Fontana during the show's first two seasons, was recast with Skylar Astin in order to "explore how perception changes."

Music
The full season four soundtrack was released on August 7, 2019. Included bonus tracks include demo versions of "Trapped in a Car", "Eleven O'Clock", "Hello, Nice to Meet You" and "Sports Analogies", and a demo version of a parody of "The Telephone Hour" from Bye Bye Birdie called "Josh Chan Is Single". Also included are seven tracks from the score by Jerome Kurtenbach, Tom Polce and Frank Ciampi.

Reception

Critical Reception
The fourth season received critical acclaim. On Rotten Tomatoes, the season holds a Certified Fresh rating of 100%, with an average rating of 9.50/10. The critical consensus reads "Carried by the exceptional Rachel Bloom and her equally talented castmates, Crazy Ex-Girlfriend's final season further explores the depths of Rebecca's mental illness with humor, heart, and humanity."

Ratings

Notes

References

Season
2018 American television seasons
2019 American television seasons